Halongella is a genus of air-breathing land snails, terrestrial pulmonate gastropod mollusks in the family Plectopylidae.

The generic name is derived from the Halong Bay, where these snails occur.

Species
Species in the genus Plectopylis include:
 Halongella fruhstorferi (Möllendorff, 1901)
 Halongella schlumbergeri (Morlet, 1886) - type species of the genus Halongella

References

Plectopylidae
Gastropod genera
Invertebrates of Vietnam